Municipal Stadium is a multi-purpose stadium, frequently used for football (soccer). It is located in Râmnicu Vâlcea, Romania, close to Zăvoi Park. It has a capacity of 12,000 people and is the home ground of SCM Râmnicu Vâlcea and Minerul Costești.

It was also the home ground of the defunct Chimia Râmnicu Vâlcea.

Link
Stadion

Football venues in Romania
Buildings and structures in Vâlcea County
Multi-purpose stadiums in Romania
Râmnicu Vâlcea
1946 establishments in Romania